Tyler Lawrence Arnason (born March 16, 1979) is an American former professional ice hockey center who played in the National Hockey League for the Chicago Blackhawks, Ottawa Senators and the Colorado Avalanche.

Early life
He is the son of former NHL winger Chuck Arnason, and was born in Oklahoma City, when his father was a member of the Oklahoma City Stars of the Central Hockey League (CHL). As a result, Arnason holds dual citizenship to both the United States and Canada.

Arnason and his family moved to Winnipeg, Manitoba following the end of his father's career. He attended St. John's-Ravenscourt School, graduating in 1997.

Arnason is the brother of Canadian actress and screenwriter Aubrey Arnason.

Playing career

Arnason was drafted by the Chicago Blackhawks in the 1998 NHL Entry Draft. In his first professional season, Arnason started out with the Blackhawks but due to poor conditioning spent most of the year with affiliate the Norfolk Admirals. He was impressive in the AHL however, selected in the All-Star game for PlanetUSA. Arnason was also awarded the Dudley "Red" Garrett Memorial Award as the league's top rookie.

In the 2002–03 season, his first full season in the NHL, Arnason played in the NHL Youngstars Game and was named in the All-Rookie team. During the 02–03 season, Arnason recorded his first career NHL hat trick, scoring all three Chicago goals in a 3–3 tie at San Jose on December 28. His best season was in 2003–04 when he amassed 55 points.  While playing with Chicago he was part of the "ABC" line with two other young forwards, Mark Bell and Kyle Calder.

In the very early morning of January 21, 2003 Arnason was involved in an off-ice incident. Arnason, Phil Housley and Theoren Fleury were leaving the Pure Platinum strip club in Columbus, Ohio when Fleury punched the club's manager in the face. Housley and Arnason had to step in to prevent Fleury from being beaten by the bouncers.

On March 9, 2006, he was traded to the Ottawa Senators in exchange for Brandon Bochenski and a second-round pick. In the nineteen games he played for Ottawa in the regular season, he registered four assists and failed to score a goal. He was a healthy scratch in the playoffs. The Senators chose not to give him a qualifying offer, so he became an unrestricted free agent.

On July 1, 2006, Arnason signed a one-year deal with the Colorado Avalanche. His dad also played in Colorado as a member of the Colorado Rockies hockey team. Arnason enjoyed a return to form by posting 49 points for the Avalanche in the 2006–07 season. He was consequently awarded a two-year extension by the Avalanche on June 22, 2007.

On July 3, 2009, Arnason signed a one-year two-way contract with the New York Rangers for the 2009–10 season. On September 17, 2009, Arnason failed to make the Rangers out of training camp and was assigned to affiliate, the Hartford Wolf Pack, for the beginning of the season. On November 10, 2009, without the ambition to play in the AHL he was suspended by the Rangers and released from his contract to sign with the European team Dinamo Riga of the Kontinental Hockey League. Following a difficult transition and recording only 11 points in 26 games, Tyler's contract was not renewed by Riga at season's end.

Returning to North America, as a free agent, he accepted a tryout invitation to attend the Florida Panthers training camp for the 2010–11 season. Subsequently, released from the Panthers during the preseason, Arnason then initially accepted another invite to his local American Hockey League club the Manitoba Moose, affiliate of the Vancouver Canucks, before electing to not report to camp on September 27, 2010. Arnason then accepted a temporary contract to return to Europe, signing with Swiss team EHC Biel of the NLA on October 14, 2010. He scored 10 points in 9 games with Biel before he moved on to EHC Visp of the NLB, signing a contract for the remainder of the season on November 11, 2010.
However a week later, Tyler was released playing in just a single game with Visp, after both parties mutually opted to exercise an exit clause in the contract on November 18, 2010. On January 31, 2011, it was announced that Arnason had joined Finnish team, Espoo Blues, for the remainder of the season. However, his tenure with his new club was again short lived, as after 8 games, Arnason sought a release from the Blues to return to the United States on February 28, 2011.

On October 7, 2011, Arnason was named on the Texas Stars opening night roster for the 2011–12 AHL season. After seven games with the Stars, Arnason opted to be released from his try-out and end his professional career.

Career statistics

Regular season and playoffs

International

Awards and honors

See also
 List of family relations in the NHL

References

External links
 

1979 births
Living people
American men's ice hockey centers
Brynäs IF players
Chicago Blackhawks draft picks
Chicago Blackhawks players
Colorado Avalanche players
Dinamo Riga players
EHC Biel players
Espoo Blues players
Fargo-Moorhead Ice Sharks players
Hartford Wolf Pack players
Ice hockey people from Oklahoma
Norfolk Admirals players
Ottawa Senators players
St. Cloud State Huskies men's ice hockey players
Sportspeople from Oklahoma City
Ice hockey people from Winnipeg
Texas Stars players
Winnipeg South Blues players
American sportspeople of Canadian descent
Canadian ice hockey centres
American expatriate ice hockey players in Sweden
Canadian expatriate ice hockey players in Sweden
American expatriate ice hockey players in Latvia
Canadian expatriate ice hockey players in Latvia
American expatriate ice hockey players in Switzerland
Canadian expatriate ice hockey players in Switzerland
American expatriate ice hockey players in Finland
Canadian expatriate ice hockey players in Finland